Ford River is an unincorporated community in Delta County, in the U.S. state of Michigan.

History
A post office was established at Ford River in 1860, and was discontinued in 1872. The community took its name from the Ford River.

References

Unincorporated communities in Delta County, Michigan